Travis Caldwell (born January 16, 1989, in Phoenix, Arizona) is an American actor. He starred as Charlie Monohan on ABC's The Gates and has appeared on NBC's Parenthood and TeenNick's Gigantic.

Career
Caldwell began his career appearing in an episode of Zoey 101 in 2006. That same year, he appeared in the short film Family Karma, along with Bruno Oliver, which was followed by two short films: The Tap in 2008 and The Juggler in 2009.

Between 2007 and 2008, Travis appeared as a guest star on TV series such as Women's Murder Club, Miss Guided, and the CBS series, Without a Trace.

In 2010, appeared in the series of TeenNick, Gigantic and the NBC's, Parenthood, in addition to completing the film Hanna's Gold, with Luke Perry. In the same year, he was cast as Charlie Monohan, on the ABC's supernatural series, The Gates, along with Frank Grillo, Rhona Mitra, Marisol Nichols, Luke Mably, Skyler Samuels, Colton Haynes and James Preston.

In 2011, Travis appears as a guest on Wizards of Waverly Place and The Lying Game. He had a prominent role as Vinnie in the 2014 feature film Hello, My Name Is Frank, and another prominent role as Johnny in the 2015 film Stolen from Suburbia.

Filmography

References

External links 

 
 

1989 births
Living people
American male television actors
Male actors from Phoenix, Arizona
21st-century American male actors